Plocamaphis is a genus of true bugs belonging to the family Aphididae.

The species of this genus are found in Europe and Northern America.

Species:
 Plocamaphis amerinae (Hartig, 1841) 
 Plocamaphis assetacea Zhang & Guangxue, 1981

References

Aphididae